The Eastern Railway (abbreviated ER) is among the 19 zones of the Indian Railways. Each division is headed by a Divisional Railway Manager (DRM). The name of the division denotes the name of the city where the divisional headquarters is located.
Eastern Railways operates India's oldest train, Kalka Mail.

History 
The East Indian Railway (EIR) Company was incorporated in 1845 to connect eastern India with Delhi. The train left Howrah station at 8:30 a.m. and reached Hooghly in 91 minutes. The management of the East Indian Railway was taken over by the British Indian government on 1 January 1925.

The Eastern Railway was formed on 14 April 1952 by amalgamating three lower divisions of the East Indian Railway: Howrah, Asansol and Danapur, the entire Bengal Nagpur Railway (BNR) and the Sealdah division of the erstwhile Bengal Assam Railway (which was already added to the East Indian Railway on 15 August 1947). Three more divisions: Dhanbad, Mughalsarai and Malda were formed later. Till 30 September 2002 ER consisted seven divisions.

On 1 October 2002 a new zone, the East Central Railway, headquarters at Hajipur, was carved out by separating the Eastern Railway's Danapur, Dhanbad and Mughalsarai divisions from it. Presently, it comprises four divisions and they are Malda Town, Howrah,  and Asansol.

In 2021, Eastern Railway completed full electrification of its 2010 km rail network in West Bengal, while in 2022, its entire network of 2848 km was electrified with the conversion of the Hansdiha-Godda section.

Divisions
 Howrah railway division
 Sealdah railway division
 Asansol railway division
 Malda railway division

Routes

Trunk routes
Howrah–Delhi main line
 Howrah–Bardhaman main line
 Howrah–Bardhaman chord line
 Bardhaman–Asansol section
 Asansol–Rajla section of Asansol–Patna line

Grand Chord and Howrah–Allahabad–Mumbai line
 Howrah–Bardhaman main line
 Howrah–Bardhaman chord line
 Bardhaman–Asansol section
 Asansol–Chhota Ambana section of Asansol–Gaya line

Sahibganj loop
 Khana–Rampurhat section of Sahibganj Loop

Howrah–New Jalpaiguri line
 Howrah–Bardhaman main line
 Howrah–Bardhaman chord line
 Bardhaman–Khana section of Bardhaman–Asansol line
 Khana–Gumani section of Sahibganj loop
 Gumani–New Farraka section of Barharwa–Azimganj–Katwa loop
 New Farakka–Malda Town section of New Farakka–Barsoi line

Suburban and Branch lines
Ahmadpur–Katwa line
Andal–Sainthia branch line
Andal–Sitarampur loop line
Bardhaman–Katwa line
Barharwa–Azimganj–Katwa loop
Deoghar–Banka–Bhagalpur branch line
Dumka–Bhagalpur line
Jasidih–Dumka–Rampurhat line
Madhupur–Giridih branch line
Howrah–Belur Math branch line
Nalhati–Azimganj branch line
Krishnanagar–Nabadwip Ghat line (NG under conversion)
Ranaghat–Lalgola line
Ranaghat–Gede line
Ranaghat–Shantipur–Krishnanagar line
Ranaghat–Bangaon line
Seoraphuli–Tarakeswar–Goghat line
Sealdah–Barasat–Bangaon line
Barasat–Hasnabad line
Sealdah–Ranaghat line
Naihati–Bandel branch line
Kalyani–Kalyani Simanta branch line
Sealdah–Budge Budge line
Sealdah–Diamond Harbour line
Sealdah–Canning line
Sealdah–Namkhana line
Kolkata Circular Railway
Calcutta Chord line

Discontinued routes 
Dum Dum–Biman Bandar branch line

EMU Carsheds 
 Howrah EMU Carshed
 Bandel EMU Carshed
 Narkeldanga EMU Carshed
 Ranaghat EMU Carshed
 Barasat EMU Carshed
 Sonarpur EMU Carshed

Loco Sheds 
Electric Loco Shed, Howrah
Diesel Loco Shed, Howrah
Electric Loco Shed, Sealdah 
Electric Loco Shed, Asansol
 Electric & Diesel Loco Shed, Bardhaman
 Diesel Loco Shed, Andal
 Diesel Loco Shed, Jamalpur

See also

 All India Station Masters' Association (AISMA)
 Zones and divisions of Indian Railways

References

External links 
Eastern Railway – Official website

Zones of Indian Railways